Autumn of the Seraphs is the fourth full-length album from the San Diego, California band Pinback. The album was released on September 11, 2007 on Touch and Go Records. The first pressing of Autumn of the Seraphs comes packaged with a limited-edition bonus disc. The bonus disc includes three brand new, unreleased, studio-recorded Pinback songs, two of which come from the Autumn sessions.

The album artwork was created by Mike Sutfin who has also contributed work for the Magic: The Gathering collectible card game.

Track listing

See also
Seraph

References

External links
Official Pinback website 
Pinback @ Myspace.com

2007 albums
Pinback albums
Touch and Go Records albums